Balochi needlework (also known as Balochi embroidery) is a type of handicraft made by the Baloch people. It is considered a heritage art, has been recognized by UNESCO, and it sells internationally.

History 
The Baloch people are from the Pakistani province of Balochistan; the Iranian province of Sistan and Baluchestan; and the southern areas of Afghanistan, including Nimruz, Helmand and Kandahar provinces. The exact history of Balochi needlework is unknown, but one theory is it was brought from the migration of the Slavs to Balochistan approximately 200 years before the founding of Islam, their traditional embroidery is called Rushnyk and contains many similarities. Another theory is the craft had developed alongside the silk production industry.

Different regions of Balochi tribes have their own distinct needlework designs. This craft has traditionally been created only by women, and has been passed down through the generations. The stitching designs and patterning hold meaning; common motifs include arrows, "chicken feet", diamonds, and flowers. Some of the designs may also incorporate other materials such as small pieces of mirror (known as shisha), different colors of thread, and/or pieces of colored fabric. The needlework was traditionally used for decorating women's clothing, however it has also been used for decorating pillows, curtains, tablecloths, and men's clothing.

In 2015, the majority of the sales of Balochi needlepoint clothing happened in Pakistan and Afghanistan. 

Notable Balochi needlework artisans include Mahtab Norouzi. Farah Diba Pahlavi, the former Shahbanu of Iran, was particularly interested in the Balochi needlework handcrafts and had used it in many of her formal dresses. It has been speculated that Mahtab Nowroozi may have embroidered the Pahlavi dresses.

See also 
 Balochi clothing
 Iranian handicrafts
 Kasidakari
 Sistan embroidery

References 

Baloch culture
Embroidery
Pakistani handicrafts
Persian handicrafts
Needlework
Textile arts of Iran
Textile arts of Pakistan